VMO can refer to:

Virtual marketing organization 
Vendor management office 
Vlaamse Militanten Order (the Order of Flemish militants)
Vastus medialis obliquus (a muscle)
VMO, maximum operating speed of an aircraft, see V speeds
VMO, designation of observation squadrons of the US Marine Corps
'Views my own' – a disclaimer
Vanishing mean oscillation in mathematics
Vegetable Marketing Organization – a vegetable wholesale organization in Hong Kong
Visiting medical officer